Antsampandrano is a town and commune in Madagascar. It belongs to the district of Antanifotsy, which is a part of Vakinankaratra Region. The population of the commune was 29,788 in 2018.

Primary and junior level secondary education are available in town. It is also a site of industrial-scale  mining. The majority 98% of the population of the commune are farmers, while an additional 1% receives their livelihood from raising livestock. The most important crop is rice, while other important products are maize and potatoes.  Services provide employment for 1% of the population.

References and notes 

Populated places in Vakinankaratra